Scopula coangulata  is a moth of the family Geometridae. It was described by Prout in 1920. It is found in India (Assam).

References

Moths described in 1920
coangulata
Moths of Asia
Taxa named by Louis Beethoven Prout